The Zamboanga bulbul (Hypsipetes rufigularis) is a songbird species in the bulbul family, Pycnonotidae. It is endemic to the Philippines, where its natural habitat is subtropical or tropical moist lowland forests of Basilan and the Zamboanga Peninsula. It is becoming rare due to habitat loss.

Taxonomy and systematics
The Zamboanga bulbul was originally described in the genus Hypsipetes and later placed in the genus Ixos. Formerly, some authorities classified the Zamboanga bulbul in the genus Iole and also considered it to be a subspecies of the Philippine bulbul. In 2010, it was returned to the genus Hypsipetes.

Footnotes

References
 Gregory, Steven M. (2000): Nomenclature of the Hypsipetes Bulbuls (Pycnonotidae). Forktail 16: 164–166. PDF fulltext
 Moyle, Robert G. & Marks, Ben D. (2006): Phylogenetic relationships of the bulbuls (Aves: Pycnonotidae) based on mitochondrial and nuclear DNA sequence data. Mol. Phylogenet. Evol. 40(3): 687–695.  (HTML abstract)
 Pasquet, Éric; Han, Lian-Xian; Khobkhet, Obhas & Cibois, Alice (2001): Towards a molecular systematics of the genus Criniger, and a preliminary phylogeny of the bulbuls (Aves, Passeriformes, Pycnonotidae). Zoosystema 23(4): 857–863. PDF fulltext

Zamboanga bulbul
Birds of Mindanao
Zamboanga bulbul
Taxonomy articles created by Polbot